John Gibb may refer to:

 John Gibb (courtier) (c. 1550–1628), Scottish courtier
 'Meikle' John Gibb (died c. 1720), Scottish religious zealot and founder of the Sweet Singers or Gibbite sect
 John Gibb (businessman) (1829–1905), cofounder of Mills & Gibb
 John Gibb (engineer) (1776–1850), Scottish civil engineer and contractor
 John Gibb (painter) (1831–1909), Scottish marine painter
 John Gibb Thom, British soldier, judge and politician

See also

Gibb (surname)
John Gibbes
John Gibbs (disambiguation)
John (disambiguation)
Gibb (disambiguation)